Polsgrove is an unincorporated community within Franklin County, Kentucky, United States. Its post office is closed.

References

Unincorporated communities in Franklin County, Kentucky
Unincorporated communities in Kentucky